Chardonnet may refer to:

Places
 Saint-Nicolas-du-Chardonnet, Roman Catholic church in the center of Paris, France located in the 5th arrondissement
 Aiguille du Chardonnet, a mountain in the French Alps

People
 Hilaire de Chardonnet (1839-1924), French scientist and industrialist who invented an early artificial textile fiber (Chardonnet silk)
 Jean Chardonnet, French professor who directed Jacques Chirac's 1954 presentation of The Development of the Port of New-Orleans
 Michèle Chardonnet (born 1956), French athlete who a bronze medal in the 1984 Summer Olympics

Other uses
 An alternative name for wine made from the Chardonnay grape